Ameriyeh (also Romanized as ‘Āmerīyeh; also known as Amīrābād) is a village in Rayen Rural District, Rayen District, Kerman County, Kerman Province, Iran. At the 2006 census, its population was 14, in 5 families.

References 

Populated places in Kerman County